Aitana Ocaña Morales (born 27 June 1999), known mononymously as Aitana, is a Catalan singer and actress. She first gained national recognition in 2017, placing as the runner-up in the revival series of the Spanish reality television talent competition Operación Triunfo. While competing on the show, Aitana recorded the single "Lo Malo" with fellow contestant Ana Guerra as part of the songs in the running to represent Spain in the 2018 Eurovision Song Contest. The song became an instant hit in Spain, debuting at number-one and holding the spot for several weeks. Following the competition, Aitana signed a 360º record deal with Universal Music and released her debut solo single "Teléfono" to commercial success and streaming-breaking records.

Her debut studio album, Spoiler, was released in 2019 and received a Latin Grammy nomination for Best Pop Vocal Album. Its accompanying concert tour visited many indoor arenas in Spain and was taped for the video album Play Tour: En Directo. In late 2020 she released her sophomore album 11 Razones. It spawned the top five singles "+ (Más)" featuring Cali y El Dandee and "Corazón Sin Vida" featuring Sebastián Yatra. Aitana ventured into acting in the Disney+ original series La Última (2022), for which she also recorded the soundtrack.

Dubbed as the "Spanish Princess of Pop", throughout her career, Aitana has accumulated four number one songs in her home country: "Lo Malo", "Teléfono", "Vas a Quedarte" and "Mon Amour". She has also been honored with a Premio Ondas, two Premios Odeón, five LOS40 Music Awards, a Radio Disney Music Award, an MTV Europe Music Award, and a Kids' Choice Award, among many others. She has also received two nominations at the Latin Grammy Awards, including Best New Artist and has been an assessor and a coach on seasons six and seven respectively of La Voz Kids.

Early life 
Aitana Ocaña Morales was born in Barcelona on June 27, 1999, as the only child of Cosme Ocaña and Belén Morales. She grew up in the municipality of Sant Climent de Llobregat and Viladecans. In 2014, Aitana began to share cover versions of popular songs on YouTube. That year, she released her first original songs.

In 2017, she completed bachillerato and was admitted to study design at university the following year. After taking selectividad, she visited Ciudad Universitaria in Madrid, where the auditions for Operación Triunfo were being held. After auditioning, she was selected for series nine of the competition.

Career

2017–2018: Operación Triunfo and first releases 
In October 2017, Aitana entered musical reality show contest Operación Triunfo. After over three months it ended with her as the show's runner-up. During her participation in the contest, she competed to represent Spain in the Eurovision Song Contest 2018 with two songs: "Arde", which she performed solo, and "Lo malo", composed by Brisa Fenoy and performed as a duet with Ana Guerra. The former song ended in second place and the latter finished third in the selection. Even though "Lo malo" hadn't been selected by the public to represent the country, it became an instant hit in Spain, topping the charts for five non-consecutive weeks and being certified 5× platinum. A remix of the song featuring Greeicy and Tini was released in August 2018. The song was performed at the 2019 Premios Lo Nuestro in Miami.

Aitana embarked on a co-headlining tour with her Operación Triunfo mates from March to December 2018. The tour consisted of 23 dates and was attended by almost 300,000 people. In July, the singer released her first solo single "Teléfono" which received mixed reviews. The song became her first number-one solo song in Spain. It topped the charts for six consecutive weeks and was certified four times platinum. Its music video became the most watched video on its first twenty-four hours on YouTube's Vevo channel in Spain. "Teléfono" was included in her debut extended play, Tráiler, which she released on November 30, 2018. The EP features six original songs, of which one is a collaboration with the Venezuelan-American singer Lele Pons. A week after, "Vas a Quedarte" was released as the EP's second single. Written alongside Colombian band Morat, it became her third number-one hit in Spain and was nominated for Best Spanish Song at the 2019 LOS40 Music Awards. She also released an illustrated book, became an ambassador for Stradivarius, took part of a Coca-Cola Christmas campaign, did a cameo in Skam España and presented Bad Bunny alongside Pons at the 19th Annual Latin Grammy Awards.

2019-2020: Spoiler and 11 Razones 
Aitana began teasing her debut studio album in March 2019 which was intended to be a new EP that would be the second of a trilogy. That same month, the singer announced that she would be embarking on an intimate promotional concert tour the month after produced by Los40. At the tour's first stop, in Barcelona, the singer revealed that she had changed her mind a little bit. Now, she wasn't scheduled to release another 6-track EP but a full album. She announced the album's name, Spoiler and hinted the release date of the album; she said that it would be released by the beginning of summer. In April she collaborated with Morat on "Presiento" and in May with former One Direction member Zayn in the revamped version of "A Whole New World" for the live action film of Disney's Aladdin. On 17 May 2019, she released "Nada Sale Mal", the lead single of her upcoming debut studio album. It peaked at four on the Spanish charts and was certified Gold. The album was released digitally and physically on 7 June 2019. It debuted at the top of the charts, was certified Gold in its first week and scored a Latin Grammy nomination for Best Pop Vocal Album at the 2020 gala. Later that month, her collaboration with Lola Indigo "Me Quedo" was released as the album's second single. Thanks to this work, Aitana was nominated for Best New Artist at the 20th Annual Latin Grammy Awards, where she also performed "Mi Persona Favorita" alongside Greeicy, Nella and Alejandro Sanz.

A reissued version of Spoiler was released on 20 December 2019, featuring five acoustic versions of her own songs and a tour documentary that features images of her concerts in Madrid, Barcelona and Granada. It hasn't been released in digital platforms but only in physical stores. Aitana ended 2019 being the third most streamed female artist on Spotify in Spain, behind Rosalía and Karol G.

The singer embarked on her first concert tour, the Play Tour in support of the album from June to December 2019, comprising 27 shows. A tour extension, alternatively titled "+ Play Tour", was planned for 2020 but was canceled due to the COVID-19 pandemic. The show was taped for the video album Play Tour: En Directo and for the Movistar+ television special Play Tour: Tras las Luces, both released in 2020.

On 18 December 2019, Aitana released "+ (Más)", featuring Cali y El Dandee, the lead single of her upcoming second studio album,. "+" achieved great commercial success in Spain, spending nine weeks at the country's top ten chart, and hinted a musical shift of Aitana to pop rock. In April 2020 she collaborated with Spanish singer David Bisbal on the duet version of his track "Si Tú la Quieres", which became a twenty hit in Spain. It would later win the LOS40 Music Award for Best Spanish Song. In May, Aitana announced that she would be collaborating with other musical acts throughout the year as part of a droplet era prior to the release of her sophomore record. Summertime saw the release of three new singles: "Enemigos", alongside Reik, "Más De Lo Que Aposté", alongside Morat, and "Tu Foto del DNI" alongside childhood friend Marmi., which was described as "a pleasant change in the singer's sound as well as one of the best vocal collaborations released by someone known for being in OT". The second single of her upcoming album, "Corazón Sin Vida" was released on 2 October, featuring vocals by Colombian singer Sebastián Yatra. It debuted at number four in Spain. On 30 October, she was featured in "Friend de Semana", a song by Danna Paola and Luisa Sonza. On November 13, she was contributed vocals to Tiësto's remix of Katy Perry's "Resilient". She described working with Perry as "a dream come true". Her work during the year was awarded a Premio Ondas for Musical Phenomenon of the Year for "being one of the most relevant national pop artists in recent years" and "an artist with a promising future and a bulwark of pop music in Spanish".

In November, Aitana announced that her sophomore studio album would be named 11 Razones, which would eventually be released on 11 December. The album is reminiscent of early 2000s pop rock, which saw a departure from the sounds she had explored on Spoiler. It debuted at number two on the PROMUSICAE chart and later peaked at the top position. Promotion for the record continued by the release of a third single, a standard black vinyl pressing and a Record Store Day limited edition of the record. A supporting concert tour and began in July in Barcelona. and ended in December at the WiZink Center in Madrid after 31 shows. The tour would also visit Latin America in 2022.

2021-present: Acting venture and Alpha 
A second dropplet era started in April 2021 with the release of the promotional single "Ni Una Más", dubbed as a "feminist anthem". It peaked at 37 on the Spanish charts. During the summer, Aitana collaborated with Fresquito and Mango on the remix of their track "Mándame Un Audio" and with novel artist Zzoilo on the remix of his debut single "Mon Amour". The latter one peaked at number one in Spain and held the position for six weeks, becoming Aitana's best chart performing single since 2018's "Vas a Quedarte". In the meantime, a duet with Evaluna Montaner, "Aunque No Sea Conmigo" was released as a single in late July, peaking at 55. In September, the singer released the solo track "Berlín". A fan favorite, it met a great performance on TikTok, peaking at fifteen in Spain.  "Formentera", a duet with Nicki Nicole, "En El Coche", and "Otra Vez" were released during 2022 as singles off her newest album. Aitana was also part on the forthcoming records of Amaia, Cali y El Dandee, Melendi, Sangiovanni, Sebastián Yatra and Pablo Alborán. 

Later that year, she starred as aspiring singer Candela in the Disney+ musical romantic drama La Última alongside Miguel Bernardeau. The five-episode television series follows Candela's relationship with aspiring boxer Diego (played by Bernardeau), which becomes strained after her career begins to overshadow his. Aitana co-wrote and produced most of the songs on the soundtrack for La Última. Its lead single, the title track "La Última", was released on 11 November 2022. The soundtrack contains 16 tracks, including eight original songs and another eight acoustic versions and received generally positive reviews. Aitana will also star alongside Fernando Guallar in the upcoming domestic film 2023 adaptation of Un peu, beaucoup, aveuglément, directed by Patricia Font.

On 3 March 2023, Aitana revealed the trailer for her upcoming studio album Alpha, alongside a tentative 2023 release date.

Other ventures

Product and endorsements 

In 2018, Aitana became the youngest ambassador of multinational clothing company Inditex released a limited edition of a T-shirt titled Pa' Mala Yo with Stradivarius as part of the promotion of her debut single "Lo Malo". Both campaigns had a great commercial impact of 2 million euros. Later that year she signed a partnership with Rimmel London and with Good Hair Day. During the fall, she released an illustration book titled La Tinta de Mis Ojos through publishing house Alfaguara. The first of three perfumes was released in December of that year, and was self-titled. She also partnered with Coca-Cola for their 2018 Christmas jingle. In 2019, a merchandising collection designed by Ana Locking was released for the singer's Play Tour.

During 2020, Aitana was announced as the new face of the summer campaign of optical company Multiópticas and released a new pair of limited sunglasses. She also became an ambassador for French fashion house Yves Saint Laurent. A second perfume of Aitana, titled Be Magnetic was released in September 2020 through Douglas, becoming their second collaboration. It featured the smell of gooseberry, tuber and musk. She parallelly collaborated with Coca-Cola again for their European #OpenToBetter campaign, which also featured Katy Perry. As part of the campaign, Aitana and Perry recorded a remixed version of the latter's track "Resilient".

2021 saw the release of a third Douglas fragrance, this time called "Aitana 1999", set for a November release; as well as a whole new clothing collection with German manufacturer Puma, which was conceived as the Wild Rose Collection. In September, Aitana collaborated with American fast food chain franchise McDonald's to launch a limited edition meal, popularly called "McAitana", that was introduced in participating McDonald's restaurants in Spain. It consisted of a €9,90 compilation of an extra cheese chicken, bacon and onion (CBO) hamburguer, french fries, Coca-Cola Zero Sugar, four chicken nuggets and an Oreo McFlurry. The partnership marked the first celebrity-endorsed McDonald's meal in Europe. Starting in 2020, the United States had already seen personalized meals selected by other celebrities such as Travis Scott, BTS, Saweetie or J Balvin. The collaboration sparked controversy due to Aitana suffering from coeliac disease and, therefore, being unable to try her own meal.

Personal life 
Following her contract with Universal Music, in October 2018, Aitana left Sant Climent de Llobregat and moved alone to an apartment in the Fuente del Berro district in Madrid owned by the Spanish actress Blanca Suárez.

In 2018, she ended her relationship with childhood boyfriend Vicente Rodríguez and began a romantic relation with Operación Triunfo companion Luis Cepeda, which caused a lot of controversy due to the 10-year age disparity. They broke up in September 2018. In late 2018, Aitana started a relationship with actor Miguel Bernardeau. They moved in together in September 2020, in a €750,000 worth house in Madrid. In December 2022, less than two weeks after the release of Our Only Chance, a limited series for Disney+ in which they were co-stars, it was reported that Aitana and Bernardeau had broken up.

Public image 
Aitana has been set as an example on various occasions for her excellent dealings with the media. The written press has highlighted the sweetness and authenticity that she exudes in her interviews, highlighting "the professionalism of the singer, who has been in the public sphere for just two years, and has never had a bad face towards the press despite the harassment she has suffered ever since she left Operación Triunfo”. Borja Terán, from 20 Minutos, wrote, in September 2021, an article on the attitude of the singer towards the public and journalists, both in televised and written interviews, where he highlighted her "authenticity" and compared her with folkloric singers of yesteryear for "sharing her experiences with that generosity that seduces, because she gives details without caring to share them with the viewer, so the public feels involved in her life, because she narrates it without apparent snobbery, without any kind of complex or moral superiority".

About her early image in the music industry, Aitana stated to Forbes that "I have had a hard time getting credibility from people in the industry. They saw me as a girl who just left OT and to see how I was going to manage her career. But more and more artists have trusted me, I have been collaborating with them —from Katy Perry to Sebastián Yatra— and my first tour, Play Tour, helped add to my credibility as an artist."

Discography

Spoiler (2019)
11 Razones (2020)
Alpha (2023)

Filmography

Film

Television

Tour 
Headlining

Play Tour (2019)
11 Razones Tour (2021-2022)

Co-headlining

 OT 2017 en concierto (2018) (with Operación Triunfo 2017)

Awards and nominations

References

External links 

 
 
 Aitana on Spotify
 
 

Singers from Barcelona
Spanish women pop singers
Spanish women singer-songwriters
Spanish singer-songwriters
Operación Triunfo contestants
Universal Music Group artists
21st-century Spanish singers
21st-century Spanish women singers
1999 births
Living people
Women in Latin music